The 2019 Jersey Flegg Cup season is the 49th season of the under-20 competition. The competition is administered by the New South Wales Rugby League and mirrors the draw and structure of its senior counterpart the Canterbury Cup. The Cronulla-Sutherland Sharks are the defending premiers.

Teams
The 2019 season features 14 teams, with the nine based in Sydney, one in Newcastle, one in Wollongong, one in Auckland, one in Canberra and one in Victoria. The Victoria Thunderbolts joined the competition in 2019 from the Queensland-based Hastings Deering Colts competition, while the Canberra Raiders and South Sydney Rabbitohs join after using their Canterbury Cup affiliates in 2018.

Ladder 
Source:

References 

2019 in Australian rugby league